Los Anormales is an album released in 2004 by reggaeton artist Hector "El Bambino", now known as Héctor el Father. The album, released under his own label, broke all record sales in Puerto Rico when 130,000 copies were sold in just two days. This album features the most important reggaeton artists such as Daddy Yankee, Don Omar, Trebol Clan, Divino, Zion and the duo Alexis & Fido. The album has gone to sell over 200,000 units.

Track listing
"Intro Los Anormales"
"Noche de Terror" (by Héctor & Tito) 
"Salvaje" (by Don Omar) 
"Machete" (by Daddy Yankee) 
"Agárrate" (by Trebol Clan)
"Llégale" (by Divino) 
"Mirándonos" (by Zion and Héctor el Father) 
"La Cuatrera" (by Jomar)
"Gata Michu Michu" (by Alexis & Fido) 
"Vamos Pa' La Calle"
"Malvada" (by Algarete & Jomar) 
"Yo Sigo Aquí" (by Héctor el Father and Naldo) 
"Contacto" (by Yaviah)
"Tú y Yo" (by Trebol Clan)
"Vámonos" (by Angel Doze)
"Pasan Los Días" (by Angel & Khriz) 
"Tu Cuerpo Me Está Tentando" (by Guayo Man and Ñengo Flow)

Sales and certifications

References 

2004 compilation albums
Héctor el Father albums
Albums produced by Luny Tunes
Albums produced by Nely